The first-seeds Jack Hawkes and Gerald Patterson claimed their second title by defeating James Anderson and Pat O'Hara Wood 6–1, 6–4, 6–2 in the final, to win the men's doubles tennis title at the 1926 Australasian Championships.

Seeds

  Jack Hawkes /  Gerald Patterson (champions)
  James Anderson /  Pat O'Hara Wood (final)
  Norman Peach /  Jim Willard (quarterfinals)
  Bob Schlesinger /  Rupert Wertheim (semifinals)
  Gar Hone /  Ernest Rowe (quarterfinals)
  Dudley Cameron /  Gar Moon (quarterfinals)
  Rice Gemmell /  Colin Gurner (semifinals)
  W. R. James /  Colin Newton (quarterfinals)

Draw

Finals

Earlier rounds

Section 1

Section 2

Notes

2R Gemmell/Gurner vs. Crawford/Hopman: some sources switch results of 2nd and 3rd set.
2R O'Dea/Thomas vs. James/Newton: some sources give 4–6, 2–6, 4–6.

References

External links
 Source for seedings

1926 in Australian tennis